Somendra Tomar is an Indian politician and a member of the 17th and 18th Legislative Assembly for Uttar Pradesh, India. He represents the Meerut South constituency of Uttar Pradesh. He is a member of the Bharatiya Janata Party.

Political career
Tomar has been a member of the 17th Legislative Assembly of Uttar Pradesh. Since 2017, he has represented the Meerut South constituency and is a member of BJP.

Tomar was awarded the Model Youth Legislative Award in the 8th Annual Convention of Indian Students' Parliament organized by M.I.T. World Peace University in Pune, on 19 January 2018.

He worked as chairman in Uttar Pradesh Panchayati Raj Samiti from December 2017 to October 2019.

Since March 2022, Tomar has been a member of the 18th Legislative Assembly of Uttar Pradesh, he has represented the Meerut South constituency and is a member of BJP.

He became State Minister in Government of Uttar Pradesh (Yogi Adityanath's Government).

Posts held

See also
Uttar Pradesh Legislative Assembly

References

Uttar Pradesh MLAs 2017–2022
Bharatiya Janata Party politicians from Uttar Pradesh
Living people
1980 births